Mohamud Noor is an American computer scientist, activist and politician. He is a Democratic–Farmer–Labor (DFL) member of the Minnesota House of Representatives, representing District 60B in the central Twin Cities metropolitan area. He is also the former director of the Confederation of Somali Community in Minnesota.

Personal life
Noor was born in 1977 in Somalia. Following the start of the civil war, he and his family sought asylum in Kenya. In 1999 they emigrated to the United States, settling in Minnesota.

Noor earned a B.S. in computer science from the Metropolitan State University. He held a part-time job at Macy's while studying.

Noor is a small business and technology consultant and the former director of the Confederation of Somali Community in Minnesota, a Minneapolis-based NGO serving immigrants.

Noor is Muslim. He is married to Farhiya Del, with whom he has four children. The family lives in Minneapolis's Cedar-Riverside neighborhood.

Career
Noor is a computer scientist by training. He was a system administrator for the Minnesota Department of Human Services. Due to a law prohibiting state employees from campaigning, he later stepped down from the position.

In 2010, Noor ran for a seat on the board of the Minneapolis Public Schools, finishing in fifth place. He was the runner-up in the next year's DFL Senate District 59 primary election. Noor's campaign was endorsed by the Minneapolis Federation of Teachers, Minnesota Association of Professional Employees, Stonewall DFL and Take Action Minnesota. In December 2013, he was appointed to the Minneapolis school board, beating out Ubah Jama on a 5-3 vote to replace the late Hussein Samatar.

In February 2014, Noor challenged veteran state representative Phyllis Kahn for her seat, district 60B. Noor's policy priorities were job creation via investments in the green economy, health care issues, and forging partnerships with the University of Minnesota. Additionally, he sought to secure more funding for schools, advocated a move away from complete reliance on property taxes, and backed the state government's request for a waiver to get out of No Child Left Behind. He supported interment at Fort Snelling National Cemetery for Hmong veterans of the Vietnam War, as well as the Affordable Care Act. In contrast to the majority of his socially conservative constituents, Noor's campaign also supported same-sex marriage. He was endorsed by former Minneapolis mayor R. T. Rybak as well as several local progressive groups, including the Minnesota Association of Professional Employees, Stonewall DFL, and the Minneapolis Federation of Teachers.

In the August 12 DFL primary, Noor lost to Kahn, receiving 1,949 votes (45.53 percent) to her 2,332 votes (54.47 percent). The primary challenge was reportedly one of Kahn's most difficult since her first election in 1972.

In 2016, Noor again sought to challenge Kahn. Ilhan Omar defeated both of them in the DFL primary to become the nominee for the 2016 Minnesota House election for district 60B, and won the general election.

In 2017, Noor ran for City Council in Minneapolis Ward 6. He lost narrowly to incumbent Abdi Warsame, after a recount.

In 2018 Noor ran for Minnesota House of Representatives seat 60B again, as Ilhan Omar was running for U.S. Congress. Noor won both the Democratic primary and the general election.

References

External links

 Official House of Representatives website

1970s births
Living people
American politicians of Somalian descent
American Muslims
Ethnic Somali people
Metropolitan State University alumni
Somalian emigrants to the United States
Politicians from Minneapolis
Democratic Party members of the Minnesota House of Representatives
African-American Muslims
Somalian Muslims
21st-century American politicians
21st-century African-American politicians